Cercle is French for circle.  It can refer to:

 circle (country subdivision)
 Cercle (French colonial), an administrative unit of the French Overseas Empire
 Cercle (Mali), the Malian administrative unit
 The specific Cercles of Mali
 Cercle Brugge K.S.V., a Belgian football club from Bruges
 Le Cercle, a foreign policy think-tank specialising in international security
 In Belgium, Cercles are Student Societies based around each faculty